The Arkadelphia Marl is a geologic formation in Arkansas in Clark, Nevada, and  Hempstead counties. It preserves fossils dating back to the Cretaceous period.

Paleofauna

Chondrichthyans

Caracharias
Dasyatis
Galeorhinus
G. girardoti
Ginglymostoma
G. lehneri
Ischyrhiza
I. avonicola
I. mira
Odontaspis
O. aculeatus
Plicatoscyllium
Ptychotrygon
Raja
R. farishi
Rhinobatos
R. casieri
Rhombodus
R. binkhorsti
Schizorhiza
Sclerorhynchus
Serratolamna
S. serrata
Squalicorax
S. kaupi
Squatina
S. hassei

See also

 List of fossiliferous stratigraphic units in Arkansas
 Paleontology in Arkansas

References

 

Cretaceous Arkansas